The 2003 Australian Individual Speedway Championship was the 2003 version of the Australian Individual Speedway Championship organised by Motorcycling Australia. The final was held at the Gosford Speedway in Gosford, New South Wales and was the last time the championship was run under the single meeting format that had been in place since the first championship was run in 1926.

Defending champion Leigh Adams of Victoria was unbeaten over his 5 heats and the final to win his 7th Australian senior championship, breaking the record of six wins by Billy Sanders. New South Wales riders Craig Watson, Todd Wiltshire and Mick Poole rounded out the top four point scorers to advance to the final. The Final was won by Adams from Wiltshire, Watson and Poole.

2003 Australian Solo Championship

Intermediate Classification
 Australian Championship
  Gosford, New South Wales - Gosford Speedway
 Referee:

Final
1 Leigh Adams
2 Todd Wiltshire
3 Craig Watson
4 Mick Poole

Heat by Heat

References

See also
 Australia national speedway team
 Sport in Australia

Speedway in Australia
Australia
Individual Speedway Championship